Maxime Gingras (born December 17, 1984) is a Canadian retired freestyle skier. He competed for Canada at the 2010 Winter Olympics, finishing 11th in the men's moguls. Gingras was born in Montreal, Quebec.

External links
Sports-Reference

1984 births
Canadian male freestyle skiers
Freestyle skiers at the 2010 Winter Olympics
Living people
Olympic freestyle skiers of Canada
Skiers from Montreal
21st-century Canadian people